Orme Square is a square in Bayswater, London, England, off the north side of Bayswater Road and on the north-west corner of Hyde Park, overlooking Kensington Gardens.

Origin of Name
It is named after the British engraver, painter, publisher of illustrated books, and property developer Edward Orme (1775-1848). 1–2 and 3 Orme Square are Grade II listed buildings.

Notable residents
 1 Rowland Hill (1795–1879), postal reformer, who lived there from 1839 to 1842, while he was introducing the penny post.
 2 Frederic Leighton, artist who lived there from 1860 to 1866.
 2 George Lascelles, 7th Earl of Harewood
 2 David Lascelles, 8th Earl of Harewood
 3 Emelia Russell Gurney, activist who lived there until her death in 1896.
 4 Leopold Canning, 4th Baron Garvagh (1878–1956), Royal Flying Corps officer and co-founder of the British Fascisti
 8 Charles Hall, Vice-Chancellor of England.
 12 Edward Dannreuther (1844-1905), German pianist and writer on music
 Mackenzie Bell (1856-1930), writer, poet and literary critic
 Henry Fauntleroy (1794-1824), forger.
 Jeremy Thorpe

References

Bayswater
Streets in the City of Westminster